Lawman is a term used in reference to an American law enforcement officer, usually a sheriff or a marshal.

Lawman may also refer to the Scandinavian legal office discussed under lawspeaker.

Television and film titles
Lawman (TV series), a hit American western series produced in 1958–62 by Warner Bros. and starring John Russell as Marshal Dan Troop on the ABC network
Lawman (film), American western directed in 1971 by Michael Winner and starring Burt Lancaster as Marshal Jared Maddox
Justified (TV series), (originally named Lawman) an American crime drama created by Graham Yost broadcast on  FX
Steven Seagal: Lawman, a program on A&E starring Steven Seagal

Other uses
 Lawman (late 12th century – early 13th century), English poet; first known writer on subject of Arthurian legends; usually referenced as Layamon
 LAWMAN, Danish cartoon figure structured as satire of American superheroes; created in 2002 by Erwin Neutzsky-Wulff and drawn by Jørgen Bitsch
 Lawman (horse) (born 2004), French thoroughbred racer; winner of 2007 Prix du Jockey Club
 Law Man, stage name of Hong Kong singer Roman Tam